Fired is a 2010  Indian horror film starring Rahul Bose and Militza Radmilovic. It is the feature film debut of director Sajit Warrier and premiered at the Cannes Marché du Film on 12 May 2010.

Plot
At the H.S.W.L HEAD OFFICE in LONDON England, the egotistical maniac Joy Mittal the CEO of the company decides to repair his scandal-ridden work record and prove to himself and his partners that he can, indeed, care for his family and be an able leader in an economic meltdown that affects everyone. He is responsible for firing almost half the employees in London and implement major cut-downs. In the turmoil that follows he decides to sack the manager RUBY, a 29-year-old seductress with whom he has been having an affair that affects his personal as well as his professional life. After a day of ultimate stress Joy finally decides to finish off all his paperwork and stand proudly in front of his partners for a board meeting that will definitely change his life. Almost after 5 hours of the firing incident, the final two hours in the office is a stressful event. The real-time depiction of the horrific time spent by JOY at the empty office filled with the curse of people who have been recently fired is the crux of the film FIRED. It's a supernatural influence that keeps JOY haunted in his own empty office, and also the twin demons of PROZAC and insecurity that turn a happy go lucky man into a stark-raving suicidal guy. In a matter of a couple of hours, the strong man Joy turns into a pleading mad guy seeing ghosts of his lover and her kid at every nook and corner. Everything around in the seemingly nondescript office become the targets of his paranoia, fed by the crazy hallucinatory effects of his anti-depressant pills. FIRED is a real-time depiction of the last two hours in the life of a CEO who has recently fired almost half his employees, set in an empty office space, which also acts as a major character, enhancing the suspense of the film.

Production
Fired was filmed in London, England. Because of depictions of nudity and some violence, the Indian Censor Board gave the film's promos an A rating which prevented them from being shown on television. The film hasn't been released theatrically due to these issues. 
Mumbai fashion designer Saisha Shinde designed the wardrobe for the film.

References

External links
Official Website

2010 films
2010s Hindi-language films
Films set in London
Indian horror films
Unreleased Hindi-language films
Hindi-language horror films